Charles Clifton (13 January 1846 – date of death unknown) was an English cricketer. Clifton was a right-handed batsman who bowled right-arm roundarm fast. He was born at Ruddington, Nottinghamshire.

Clifton made his first-class debut for Nottinghamshire against Surrey in 1873 at The Oval, with him making a further first-class appearance that season against Sussex at the County Ground, Hove. Six first-class appearances for the county followed in 1874, while in 1875 he made a first-class appearance for the North in the North v South fixture. It was in 1875 that he also made a final first-class appearance for Nottinghamshire against the Marylebone Cricket Club at Lord's. Clifton made eight first-class appearances for the county, scoring a total of 163 runs at an average of 11.64, with a high score of 45.

He later stood as an umpire in two first-class matches, one between Cambridge University and Yorkshire in 1885, and another in 1887 between Cambridge University and the Marylebone Cricket Club. His father-in-law James Grundy and brother-in-law John Grundy both played first-class cricket.

References

External links
Charles Clifton at ESPNcricinfo
Charles Clifton at CricketArchive

1846 births
Year of death missing
People from Ruddington
Cricketers from Nottinghamshire
English cricketers
Nottinghamshire cricketers
North v South cricketers
English cricket umpires